Said Fettah (born 15 January 1986) is a Moroccan footballer who plays as a midfielder for Bab Berred.

Fettah played for Morocco at the 2005 FIFA World Youth Championship in the Netherlands.

Club career
Born in Casablanca, Fettah joined Raja Casablanca at age 10 after being discovered by Fethi Jamal. Fettah made his debut for the Raja first team in 2004. He made his breakthrough in 2006 under head coach Oscar Fulloné, and grew into a starter for the side which won the Botola in 2009. He decided to leave the club in December 2010 to join city rivals Wydad Casablanca, after spats with management. There, he took part in two CAF Champions League campaigns and reached the final in 2011, which was lost to Espérance Tunis.

After a short return to Raja, a stint with FAR Rabat, a loan to Emirati club Ittihad Kalba, as well as a short stay at Widad Témara in 2018, Fettah began playing for fifth-tier club Bab Berred in 2020.

International career
Fettah was first called up for the Morocco national team in 2011 to play two qualifying matches for 2012 Africa Cup of Nations. He qualified with Morocco, but was eventually not called up for the main tournament.

Honours
Raja Casablanca
 Arab Club Champions Cup: 2006
 Botola: 2008–09

Wydad Casablanca
 CAF Champions League runner-up: 2011

References

1986 births
Living people
Moroccan footballers
Footballers from Casablanca
Wydad AC players
Raja CA players
AS FAR (football) players
Al-Ittihad Kalba SC players
Widad Témara players
Morocco under-20 international footballers
UAE Pro League players
Association football midfielders
Moroccan expatriate footballers
Expatriate footballers in the United Arab Emirates
Moroccan expatriate sportspeople in the United Arab Emirates
Botola players
Morocco international footballers